Bondarreh is a village in Chenar Rural District, Kabgian District, Dana County, Kohgiluyeh and Boyer-Ahmad Province, Iran. At the 2006 census, its population was 33, in 8 families.

References 

Populated places in Dana County